Syneta seriata is a species of leaf beetle. It is found in North America. It feeds on California live oak (Quercus agrifolia) and California black oak (Quercus californica).

References

Further reading

 

Synetinae
Articles created by Qbugbot
Beetles described in 1859
Taxa named by John Lawrence LeConte